The 1972 United States presidential election in New York took place on November 7, 1972. All 50 states and the District of Columbia, were part of the 1972 United States presidential election. Voters chose 41 electors to the Electoral College, which voted for President and Vice President.

New York was won by incumbent Republican President Richard Nixon, who succeeded in securing re-election against Democratic Senator George McGovern of South Dakota. Nixon ran with Vice President, and former Maryland Governor, Spiro Agnew for vice president, and McGovern ran with United States Ambassador Sargent Shriver for vice president. In the midst of a nationwide Republican landslide, Nixon took 58.54% of the vote in New York State to McGovern's 41.21%, a margin of 17.34%. New York weighed in for this election as more Democratic than the national average by about 6%. 

Nearly all counties in New York State turned out for Nixon, and only the New York City boroughs of Manhattan, Brooklyn and the Bronx voted for McGovern. McGovern was able to win New York City as a whole with his victories in these three boroughs, taking two-thirds of the vote in Manhattan and also winning majority votes in Brooklyn and the Bronx. However, Nixon was able to put in a relatively strong performance citywide, winning 56% of the vote in Queens and 74% of the vote in Staten Island. 1972 remains the last election in which a Republican presidential nominee has won any New York City borough other than Staten Island, Queens being a heavily populated county that was historically key to Republican competition in New York. This was also the last election in which a Republican presidential nominee has won the upstate counties of Erie County, where the city of Buffalo is located, and Albany County, where the state capital of Albany is located, as well as in turn, the last Republican to win every county of upstate New York. Both of these counties have become solidly Democratic in the years that have followed. 

The presidential election of 1972 was an extremely partisan election for New York, with 99.75% of the electorate voting either Republican or Democrat. Having delivered as President a period of relative economic stability and growth, and showing promising movements towards peace in Vietnam, Nixon was able to gain reelection with electors from every State in the U.S., except Massachusetts and the District of Columbia. The Vietnam War continued to be a strong issue during this election, with both candidates declaring desire to end the conflict.

This was the first election since 1808 in which New York did not have the largest number of electors in the Electoral College, having fallen to 41 electors versus California's 45 as a result of the 1970 census. It is also the only presidential election from 1952 onwards in which New York did not vote the same way as Massachusetts. As of the 2020 U.S. presidential election, this is the last time that New York state voted more Republican than Michigan, Wisconsin, and South Dakota. 1972 is also the last time that a Republican presidential candidate won Downstate New York in terms of the total number of votes.

Results

Results by county

See also
 United States presidential elections in New York
 George McGovern 1972 presidential campaign
 Presidency of Richard Nixon
 Presidency of Gerald Ford
 Watergate scandal

References

New York
1972
1972 New York (state) elections